Frank Verlaat (born 5 March 1968) is a Dutch former professional footballer who played as a defender.

He had a 21-year career throughout Europe, playing in the Netherlands, Switzerland, France, Germany and finishing his career in Austria. He earned one cap with the Netherlands national team.

Career
Verlaat moved to Bundesliga club VfB Stuttgart from French side AJ Auxerre in 1995. For VfB Stuttgart, he made 104 appearances in the league, two in continental competitions and six in the DFB-Pokal.

Verlaat returned to former club Ajax in January 1999. The transfer fee was reported as DM8.5 million.

In summer 2000, Verlaat joined Bundesliga club Werder Bremen from Ajax on a three-year contract. The transfer fee paid to Ajax was reported as DM3.5 or 4 million.

Personal life
Verlaat's son Jesper is also a footballer and has also played for Werder Bremen, albeit for the club's reserves.

Honours
Ajax
European Cup Winners’ Cup: 1986–87

Auxerre
French Cup: 1993–94

VfB Stuttgart
DFB-Pokal: 1996–97

References

External links
 
 Profile at dutchplayers.nl
 

1968 births
Living people
Footballers from Haarlem
Dutch footballers
Association football defenders
Netherlands international footballers
Eredivisie players
Ligue 1 players
Bundesliga players
Austrian Football Bundesliga players
AFC Ajax players
FC Lausanne-Sport players
AJ Auxerre players
VfB Stuttgart players
SV Werder Bremen players
FK Austria Wien players
SK Sturm Graz players
Dutch expatriate footballers
Dutch expatriate sportspeople in France
Expatriate footballers in France
Dutch expatriate sportspeople in Switzerland
Expatriate footballers in Switzerland
Dutch expatriate sportspeople in Austria
Expatriate footballers in Austria
Dutch expatriate sportspeople in Germany
Expatriate footballers in Germany